Mayŏng station is a small railway station in Mayŏng-rodongjagu, Onch'ŏn county, South P'yŏngan province, North Korea. It is the terminus of the Ryonggang Line of the Korean State Railway. The station provides freight service to a small mine nearby, and there is a local passenger train, 733/734, operating between Mayŏng and Kangsŏ on the P'yŏngnam Line.

References

Railway stations in North Korea